The Watson Gordon Chair of Fine Art is a professorship at the University of Edinburgh.

History
The chair was founded in 1880. John Watson Gordon was a Scottish painter who died in 1864. His brother and sister endowed the professorship in his memory in 1879. The establishment of the chair resulted in progress in the teaching of art history.

Professors
 Gerard Baldwin Brown 1880–1930 
 Herbert Read 1931–1933 
 David Talbot Rice 1934–1972
 Giles Robertson 1973–1981
 Eric Fernie 1984–1995
 Richard Thomson 1996–

References

Fine Art, Watson Gordon, Edinburgh
Fine Art, Watson Gordon
1880 establishments in Scotland